Luke Gerald Michael Thomas (born 19 February 1999) is an English professional footballer who plays as an attacking midfielder for League One side Barnsley. Previously with Cheltenham Town and Derby County, he also played for Gloucester City and Coventry City on loan prior to joining Barnsley in 2019.

Club career
Thomas began his career with National League club Cheltenham Town, making his only first team appearance against Chelmsford City in the FA Trophy. He had a trial with Portuguese club Benfica in 2015. He joined Derby County in January 2016 for an undisclosed transfer fee, signing a two-and-a-half-year professional contract. He had a loan spell with National League North club Gloucester City during the 2016–17 season.

Thomas was nominated for the Premier League 2 Player of the Month award in September 2017 as a result of his performances for Derby County's under-23 team. He signed a new three-year contract with Derby in October 2017. He was first named in a first team matchday squad on 31 October 2017 against Leeds United, and made his league debut on 21 November 2017, coming on as an 89th-minute substitute for Tom Lawrence in a 2–0 win over Queens Park Rangers.

Thomas signed a new four-year contract with Derby in August 2018. Later that month, he joined League One Coventry City on a half-season loan until the start of 2019. In January 2019, the loan was extended for the rest of the season.

Barnsley
In June 2019, he joined Barnsley for an undisclosed fee. On his debut he scored the winning goal for Barnsley in a 1–0 win against Fulham.

In January 2021, Thomas joined Ipswich Town on loan for the remainder of the season. On 8 April 2021, Thomas announced on social media that he had cut his loan move with Ipswich short due to personal reasons and he returned to Barnsley.

Bristol Rovers (loan)
On 10 July 2021, Thomas joined League Two side Bristol Rovers on a season-long loan deal. On 13 October, he scored his first goal for the club when he opened the scoring in a 2–1 EFL Trophy defeat to Chelsea U21s. On 23 November 2021, Thomas came off the bench in a 1–1 draw against nine-men Salford City, missing a great chance to put Rovers two ahead before the home side eventually equalised. After the match, Thomas' manager Joey Barton criticised Thomas claiming that he "thinks the world owes him a favour" and that "if he doesn't get his finger out, this opportunity at Rovers is going to pass him by". Barton continued with his criticism of Thomas the following day, claiming that the club had tried to terminate his loan in the summer, the same window in which Thomas had been signed after the player had stormed out of training a number of times in frustration. In January 2022, Thomas admitted that he deserved the criticism and had let people down. The season ended with Rovers getting promoted on the final day of the season, moving into the automatic promotion spots on goals scored.

Return to Barnsley
After speculation surrounding Thomas and a permanent return to Bristol Rovers, he found himself in the first team picture under new manager Michael Duff and scored the only goal in the second match of the season as Duff was given his first win in charge over Thomas' former club Cheltenham Town. On 8 October 2022, it was confirmed that Thomas had suffered a broken leg in training that would see the winger out of action for at least four months.

International career
Thomas made his youth international debut on 6 September 2019 with England U20, coming on as an 80th minute substitute for Luke Bolton in a 0–0 draw against Netherlands U20 at New Meadow.

Career statistics

Honours
Bristol Rovers
EFL League Two third-place promotion: 2021–22

References

External links

1999 births
Living people
People from Forest of Dean District
English footballers
Association football midfielders
Cheltenham Town F.C. players
Derby County F.C. players
Gloucester City A.F.C. players
Coventry City F.C. players
Barnsley F.C. players
Ipswich Town F.C. players
Bristol Rovers F.C. players
National League (English football) players
English Football League players
England youth international footballers